Dnyaneshwar Raosaheb Patil is a Shiv Sena politician from Osmanabad district. He was Member of the Legislative Assembly from Paranda (Vidhan Sabha constituency) of Osmanabad District, Maharashtra, India as a member of Shiv Sena. He has been elected consecutively for 2 terms in the Maharashtra Legislative Assembly for 1995 and 1999.

Positions held
 1995: Elected to Maharashtra Legislative Assembly
 1999: Re-Elected to Maharashtra Legislative Assembly
 2010: Elected as Director of Osmanabad district central cooperative Bank
 2015: Re-Elected as Director of Osmanabad district central cooperative Bank

See also
 Sina Kolegaon Dam
 Paranda Fort
 Bhoom
 Washi

References

External links
 Shivsena Home Page
 http://www.loksatta.com/maharashtra-news/shiv-sena-congress-ncp-ahead-in-gram-panchayat-election-1129838/

Living people
Shiv Sena politicians
Maharashtra MLAs 1995–1999
Maharashtra MLAs 1999–2004
People from Osmanabad district
Marathi politicians
Year of birth missing (living people)